The Walker Cup is a golf trophy contested in odd-numbered years by leading male amateur golfers in two teams: United States, and Great Britain and Ireland. The official name is the Walker Cup Match (not "Matches" as in Ryder Cup Matches). It is organised by The R&A and the United States Golf Association (USGA). In 1921 the Royal Liverpool Golf Club hosted an unofficial contest which was followed by official annual contests from 1922 through 1924. From 1925 they became biennial, held on even-number years. After World War II they switched to odd-numbered years. From 2026 it will be held in even-numbered years following the switch of the Eisenhower Trophy to odd-numbered years to avoid that event clashing with the Olympic Games. They are held alternately in the U.S., and Ireland or Britain.

The cup is named after George Herbert Walker who was president of the USGA in 1920 when the match was initiated. Walker is the grandfather and namesake of George H. W. Bush and great-grandfather of George W. Bush, the 41st and 43rd Presidents of the United States, respectively.

Unlike the Ryder Cup, which similarly began as a competition between the U.S. and the United Kingdom, the Walker Cup has never been expanded to include all European amateur golfers.

As of 2021, the U.S. lead the Walker Cup series 38 to 9, with one match tied, but the two teams have been more evenly matched since 1989 when the Great Britain and Ireland team ended the U.S. team's eight-match winning run. The 1989 match and the three matches from 2003 to 2007 were all decided by a single point.

Founding of the Cup

Royal Liverpool (Hoylake) 1921
A team of American amateur golfers travelled in Britain in 1921, their objective being to win The Amateur Championship at Royal Liverpool (Hoylake). A match between American and British male amateur golfers was played on May 21, immediately before The Amateur Championship. This match was announced in The Times on May 10. The Times reports that the match was arranged by Gershom Stewart M.P., Chairman of Royal Liverpool Golf Club.

The British team was: Tommy Armour, Colin Aylmer, Ernest Holderness, James Jenkins, Reymond de Montmorency, Gordon Simpson, Cyril Tolley and Roger Wethered. The American team was Chick Evans, William C. Fownes Jr. (Captain), Jesse Guilford, Paul Hunter, Bobby Jones, Francis Ouimet, J. Wood Platt, Fred Wright. The Americans won the match 9–3.

Format
The Walker Cup employs a combination of foursomes (alternate-shot) and singles competition and was originally the format used for the professional equivalent Ryder Cup. Up to 1961, 36 holes matches were played: four foursomes on the first day and eight singles matches on the second day. From 1963, 18 hole matches were played, with four foursomes and eight singles matches on each day. In 2009, the number of singles matches on the second day was increased to 10, so that all members of the team play on this final afternoon.

Results
Half points for halved matches were first awarded in 1971. Note that in the following table, half points for halved matches are included in the total scores prior to 1971 for consistency with later years. The following scores include halved matches: 1923: 1, 1926: 1, 1932: 3, 1934: 1, 1936: 3, 1938: 1, 1951: 3, 1957: 1, 1963: 4, 1965: 2, 1967: 4, 1969: 6

Source:

Of the 48 matches, USA has won 38 matches, Great Britain and Ireland have won 9 with 1 match tied.

Future sites 
 2023 – Old Course at St Andrews (St Andrews, Fife, Scotland), September 2–3
 2025 – Cypress Point Club (Pebble Beach, California), September 6–7
 2028 – Bandon Dunes Golf Resort (Bandon, Oregon)
 2032 – Oakmont Country Club (Oakmont, Pennsylvania)
 2036 – Chicago Golf Club (Wheaton, Illinois)

From 2026, matches will be held in even-numbered years. Venues for the 2026 and 2030 events have not been announced.

See also
List of American Walker Cup golfers
List of Great Britain and Ireland Walker Cup golfers
Curtis Cup

References

External links
Official site

 
Team golf tournaments
Amateur golf tournaments
R&A championships
United States Golf Association championships
Biennial sporting events